The Wolfskopf ("Wolf's Head") is a 668.5 metre high mountain in the West Harz in central Germany. It lies in the district of Göttingen roughly 2 km east of Kamschlacken and about 5 km southwest of Altenau.

The Wolfsklippen crags, to the south which extend for about 60 metres in length (580 to 640 m above NN), are classed as a  natural monument.

See also 
 List of mountains and hills in Lower Saxony

Sources 
Topographische Karte 1:25000, No. 4228 Riefensbeek

Mountains of the Harz
Mountains of Lower Saxony
Mountains under 1000 metres
Göttingen (district)